Kat Howard is an American author and editor. Her stories have been published in the anthologies Stories (edited by Neil Gaiman and Al Sarrantonio), and Oz Reimagined (based on L. Frank Baum's characters). She is also a contributor to magazines such as Lightspeed, Subterranean, Uncanny Magazine and Apex.  She attended the Clarion Writers Workshop in 2008. She is a 2018 recipient of the Alex Awards.

Bibliography

Short story collections
 A Cathedral of Myth and Bone: Stories (Gallery / Saga Press, 2019)

Novels and novellas
 The End of the Sentence (Subterranean Press, 2014), co-written with Maria Dahvana Headley, "a fairytale of ghosts and guilt, literary horror blended with the visuals of Jean Cocteau, failed executions, shapeshifting goblins, and magical blacksmithery."
 Roses and Rot (S&S/Saga, 2016)
 An Unkindness of Magicians (Saga, 2017)

Selected short stories
"All Of Our Past Places", at The Journal of Unlikely Cartography
"To Hold the Mirror", Interfictions
"Breaking the Frame", Lightspeed
"Hath no Fury", Subterranean Press

Awards

In addition to several World Fantasy Award nominations, her work has received the following awards and recognitions:

 NPR Best Book of 2014: The End of the Sentence, co-written with Maria Dahvana Headley
 Locus Award for Best First Novel finalist: Roses and Rot
 NPR Best Book of 2017: An Unkindness of Magicians
 Alex Award, 2018: An Unkindness of Magicians

References

External links 

21st-century American novelists
21st-century American short story writers
American women novelists
American women short story writers
Year of birth missing (living people)
Living people
21st-century American women writers